Orativ is an urban locality (urban-type settlement) in Vinnytsia Oblast, located in the historic region of Podolia, Ukraine. It was the administrative seat of the former Orativ Raion. Until 1984 Orativ was a village. Population: 

Orativ was the birthplace of the 3rd Prime Minister of Israel Levi Eshkol.

History 

Until the Partitions of Poland Oratów was part of the Bracław Voivodeship of the Lesser Poland Province of the Polish Crown.

References

External links
 Orativ at the Ukrainian Soviet Encyclopedia
 The murder of the Jews of Orativ during World War II, at Yad Vashem website.

Urban-type settlements in Vinnytsia Raion
Lipovetsky Uyezd
Holocaust locations in Ukraine